Khan Bahadur Maj.Gen. Fateh Naseeb Khan,  OBE KB (1888–1933), was the Commander-in-chief of Alwar State Forces. He was a close confidant and trusted aide of Maharaja Jai Singh Prabhakar Bahadur, who was the Maharaja of Alwar State. He participated in World War I.

Background and family

He belonged to a Khanzada Muslim Rajput family. He was a descendant of Raja Nahar Khan, who was a Rajput ruler of Mewat.

He had six sons namely, Subedar-Major Abdul Majeed Khan, Deputy Director (FIA) SP (R) Abdul Waheed Khan, Major Muhammad Iqbal Khan (PR), Dr Muhammad Allahdad Khan, Colonel Malik Niaz Ahmad Khan (PA) and Dr Khursheed Alam Khan. After the Partition of India in 1947, they migrated to Hyderabad, Pakistan.

Titles and honours

He was the recipient of the following titles and honours:

 Tazimi Sardar
 Mumtaz-e-Khas Alwar
Officer of the Order of the British Empire 
Khan Bahadur
Khan Sahib

State Service

Naib risaldar,  Alwar State Forces, 1904
Risaldar,  Alwar State Forces, 1907
Risaldar Major,  Alwar State Forces, 1910
Additional Aide-de-camp to Maharaja of Alwar State, 1913
Aide-de-camp to Maharaja of Alwar State, 1914
Deputed to Imperial Service Troops during World War I, 
Officer in Charge, Alwar Elephantry military unit, Alwar State Forces, 1916
Squadron Commander, Alwar State Forces, 1920
Commanding officer,  Alwar State Forces, 1922
Commander-in-chief, Alwar State Forces, 1930

References 

 >
 The Administration Report Of The Alwar State>
 The Administration Report Of The Alwar State>
 Thacker's Indian Directory 1931>

1888 births
1933 deaths
People from Alwar
People from Tijara
Khan Bahadurs